Ilan Leibovitch (born 25 January 1967) is a former Israeli politician who served as a member of the Knesset for Shinui between 2003 and 2006.

Biography
Born in Rehovot, Leibovitch gained a BA in international relations and political science at the Hebrew University of Jerusalem and a law degree from the College of Management.

For the 2003 elections he was placed 13th on Shinui's list, and entered the Knesset when the party won 15 seats. During his first term, he was a member of the Foreign Affairs and Defense Committee, the Committee on the Status of Women, the Committee on Foreign Workers, the Committee on Drug Abuse, the Committee on Foreign Workers, the Economic Affairs Committee and the State Control Committee.

Following a split in the party in January 2006, Leibovitch and Ehud Rassabi were left as the only two sitting MKs in Shinui. He was placed third on the party's list for the 2006 elections, but lost his seat when the party failed to cross the electoral threshold.

References

External links

1953 births
Living people
People from Rehovot
 Hebrew University of Jerusalem Faculty of Social Sciences alumni
Shinui politicians
Members of the 16th Knesset (2003–2006)